Metro High School may refer to:

Metro High School (Iowa) — Cedar Rapids, Iowa
Metro Academic and Classical High School — St. Louis, Missouri
Metro Early College High School — Columbus, Ohio